Looking East: A Suite in Three Parts is a double album by American jazz trumpeter Raphe Malik featuring a quartet with reedman Sabir Mateen, bassist Larry Roland and drummer Codaryl "Cody" Moffett, which was released on the Boxholder label. The album documents a concert performance organized by the Boston Creative Music Alliance in 1999.

Reception

In his review for AllMusic, Eugene Chadbourne states "Trumpeter Malik leads his quartet through an extended composition in a half-dozen sections, exhibiting superb timing, a sense of drama, and impeccable taste in his associates."

The Penguin Guide to Jazz notes "Malik is in top form, but Mateen tends to go off at half-cock, and very abrasive half-cock at that, which just encourages Moffet to go mad."

The All About Jazz review by John Sharpe says "Malik is a powerful player with a bright brassy sound deployed in darting, fizzing lines and heraldic fanfares."

In his review for JazzTimes Aaron Steinberg notes "Malik leaves the greatest print on the music. His brash, wide-stroke trumpet sound is highlighter-tip thick compared to most ball-point trumpet blurts, and his contributions range from fluttering strings of high notes to swaggering low notes, or fragments of boppish lines delivered with confidence and kick."

Track listing
All compositions by Raphe Malik.

Disc One
 "Zero Grade" – 11:18
 "Fractals" – 11:54
 "The Old Your Majesty" – 13:56 
 "The New Majesty" – 21:11

Disc Two
 "Reversal" – 13:38
 "Smooth Moffetting" – 18:58
 "Cosmic G" – 14:12

Personnel
Raphe Malik – trumpet
Sabir Mateen – tenor sax, alto sax, flute, b-flat clarinet, alto clarinet
Larry Roland – bass
Codaryl "Cody" Moffett - drums

References

 
2001 live albums
Raphe Malik live albums